Medina Eisa (born 3 January 2005) is an Ethiopian long-distance runner. She won the gold medal in the 5000 metres at the 2022 World Athletics Under-20 Championships and silver in the junior race at the 2023 World Cross Country Championships.

Career
In June 2021, aged 16, Medina Eisa placed tenth in the 5000 metres race at the Ethiopian Olympic trials ahead of the delayed 2020 Summer Olympics in Tokyo.

In April 2022, she finished fourth in the event at the Ethiopian Athletics Championships held in Hawassa, running a time of 15:50.3. She claimed the gold medal for the women's 5000 m at the World Under-20 Championships in Cali, Colombia in August, clocking 15:29.71 ahead of compatriot Melknat Wudu and third-placed Uganda’s Prisca Chesang. In October, Eisa won the Northern Ireland International Cross Country 6 km race held in Dundoland, Belfast in a time of 21:07.

In February 2023, she earned the silver medal in the junior women's race at the World Cross Country Championships, running 21:00 to finish seven seconds behind compatriot Senayet Getachew. With the one-two Ethiopia took gold in the team standings.

Personal bests
 3000 metres – 8:41.42 (Rabat 2022)
 5000 metres – 14:59.53 (Hengelo 2021)
Road
 5 kilometres – 14:53 (Herzogenaurach 2022)

References

2005 births
Living people
Ethiopian female athletes
World Athletics U20 Championships winners